Dhubri Law College is a non-government law college situated at College Nagar, Bidyapara in Dhubri in the Indian state of Assam. It offers undergraduate 3 years law courses, 5 Year Integrated B.A. LL.B. course and post graduate LL.M course  affiliated to Gauhati University. This College is recognised by Bar Council of India, New Delhi.

Dhubri Law College offers a 3-year Bachelor of Laws (LLB) program, which is a full-time course. The course is divided into six semesters and covers various aspects of law, such as criminal law, civil law, constitutional law, corporate law, etc.

Admission to the LLB program at Dhubri Law College is based on the candidate's performance in the entrance exam conducted by Gauhati University. The eligibility criteria for the LLB program is a Bachelor's degree in any discipline from a recognized university with a minimum of 45% marks (40% for reserved category candidates).

History
Dhubri Law College was established on 10 September 1967 in Dhubri. It was founded by eminent lawyer and educationist Dinesh Ranjan Sarkar. He was the first Princpal and founder Secretary of Dhubri Law College.

References

Law schools in Assam
Educational institutions established in 1967
1967 establishments in Assam
Colleges affiliated to Gauhati University
Dhubri